Paul Hermann Otto Eggert (born 4 February 1874 in Tilsit, d. January 20, 1944 in Gdańsk) was a German surveyor and professor of Gdańsk University of Technology. He was also dean of the Faculty of Civil Engineering from 1909 to 1910 and from 1919 to 1920 and the first head of the Department of Geodesy at the Technical University of Gdańsk (1904-1921).

Eggert was a professor at the Technical University of Berlin and its rector in 1933–1934. From 1936 to 1939, he headed the Geodetic Institute in Potsdam (—nowadays Helmholtz Centre Potsdam, GFZ German Research Centre for Geosciences). In 1900 he received his doctorate in the field of surveying and environmental engineering at the Higher School of Agriculture in Berlin, now part of Humboldt University in Berlin, where he gained his first experience in the field of advanced mathematical, geodetic and astronomical research.

In 1920 he was voted member of the German Academy of Sciences Leopoldina.

Publications (selected) 
Eggert, O. (1900).  (dissertation)

Eggert, O. (1903). 

Eggert, O. (1907). . Publisher: Bibliotheca Teubneriana (Introduction to geodesy).

Eggert, O. (1910).  (Handbook of civil engineering: earthworks, retaining walls, curtain walls, quay walls and retaining walls, construction of foundations, construction of roads, railways and the construction of tunnels—surveying services)

Jordan, W., Reinhertz, C. J. C., Eggert, O. (1914). . Publisher: JB Metzler (Handbook of geodesy).

Jordan, W., Eggert, O. (1935)  (Handbook of geodesy. 1. Alignment measurement method of least squares; 2–1. The measurement and valuation of land 2-2. Leveling measurements, Surveying, Photogrammetry and stake; 3–1. Geodesy, geometry on the sphere, astronomical observations; 3–2. The geometry of spherical, ellipsoid earth Conformal mapping and of geodesy tasks).

References

External links 
 Otto Hermann Paul Eggert biography—Technische Universität Berlin

1874 births
1944 deaths
German geodesists
Academic staff of the Technical University of Berlin